Alcyna acia is a species of minute sea snail, a marine gastropod mollusk or micromollusk in the family Trochidae, the top snails.

Description
The size of the shell attains 3mm.

Distribution
This marine species is endemic to Australia and occurs off Southern Australia and West Australia.

Environmental Conditions 
This marine species tends to live in places with a sea surface temperature of 15-25 °C (59-77 °F).

References

Cotton, B.C. 1948. Southern Australian Gastropoda. Part 3. Transactions of the Royal Society of South Australia 72(1): 30-32
Wilson, B. 1993. Australian Marine Shells. Prosobranch Gastropods. Kallaroo, Western Australia : Odyssey Publishing Vol. 1 408 pp.

External links
To World Register of Marine Species

acia
Gastropods described in 1948